The Provincetown Art Association and Museum (PAAM) is located at 460 Commercial Street in Provincetown, Massachusetts. It is accredited by the American Alliance of Museums and is the most attended art museum on Cape Cod. The museum's permanent collection includes over 2,500 objects, a number which continues to grow through donations and new acquisitions. PAAM mounts approximately forty exhibitions each year.

History

Origins
	
Prominent artists Oliver Newberry Chaffee, Marsden Hartley, Charles Demuth, Charles Hawthorne, Oscar Gieberich, William Halsall, Gerrit Beneker, E. Ambrose Webster, Kenneth Stubbs and several local business men and women established the Provincetown Art Association on August 22, 1914. For the first two years, the Association met monthly at members' homes or at the home of its first President, William H. Young, who was President of the local Seamen's Savings Bank. As lectures were incorporated, the meetings moved to the Church of the Pilgrims near Town Hall.

The organizing artists donated works and mounted two juried exhibitions in the summer of 1915 at the Provincetown Town Hall, beginning a tradition of collecting and exhibiting the work of local artists. By this time, Provincetown had become a refuge of artists and expatriates returned from war-torn Europe. The town was firmly established as "The Biggest Art Colony in the World" (Boston Globe, 8/8/16). PAAM strengthened its role as the anchor of this art colony through the purchase of two plots of land, the Bangs property in 1919, and the adjoining house on the east side in 1920, with the latter plot forming the site of the current gallery building.

The Association's first director was Harry N. Campbell in 1917, followed by E. Ambrose Webster and John "Wichita Bill" Noble. His son, John A. Noble, also became a prominent artist. 

John Cuthbert Hare was also a member who eventually became known as the "Dean of Cape Cod Artists"

Twentieth Century
PAAM's artist founders had come out of the Impressionist tradition and thus did not readily accept the new Modernist movement. Faced with aesthetic differences among its artist membership, however, the organization worked to maintain a balance in the work it exhibited. 

True to its mission, PAAM mounted separate "Modern" and "Regular" summer exhibitions between 1927 and 1937. In the "First Modernistic Exhibition" of July 1927, the Association exhibited for the first time Modernist artists such as Jack Tworkov, Niles Spencer, and George Ault, among others.

Partial conciliation was reached between modernists and conservatives in August, 1936 when the Association voted to mount a combined exhibition in 1937 with concurrent exhibitions hung in the same gallery on opposite walls.

The Depression years of the '30s and the war years of the early '40s were difficult times for the town and the Association. The Hawthorne Memorial Gallery was completed in 1942, and initially featured 12 paintings by Charles Webster Hawthorne, including "The Trousseau" and "The Family". Although annual shows were canceled, volunteers managed to maintain a reduced schedule despite the challenges created by gasoline rationing, conscription, blackouts and economic hardships during the World War II years. 

By 1947, the regular schedule of two summer exhibitions had been reestablished along with catalog printing, with new artists featured such as Madeleine L'Engle, Howard Mitcham, Xavier Gonzalez and Adolph Gottlieb.   The rise of Abstract Expressionism—intensified by the location of Hans Hofmann's summer school here—again riffled the deep divisions within the arts community during the '50s.

When PAAM celebrated its 50th anniversary in 1964 with a retrospective show of its major artists, the organization focused on gaining national attention for Provincetown's considerable contribution to American art. The effect was a boon for the organization. Activities increased, new galleries were added, the exhibition schedule expanded, a storage vault was built to house the expanding collection, and once again PAAM showed itself as the center of the local art world.

As PAAM grew throughout the next three decades, the organizational structure of the museum continued to include strong representation from both the artist and lay communities. PAAM'S dual purpose of the organization—to be a collecting museum and a professional artists' association—has been consistently supported over the course of its history. The collection has been the basis for many exhibitions and has served scholars, researchers and other museums. Including close to 2,500 works from artists who have lived or worked on the outer Cape.

Recent
PAAM continues to acquire both historical and contemporary works. The galleries also offer accommodating venues for chamber music, jazz, dance and spoken word performances. The new studio classrooms offer spaces for children and youth education programs, as well as for adult courses in the Lillian Orlowsky/William Freed Museum School at PAAM.

Timeline
Select art historical events in Provincetown over the past 100 years

Facilities

The Provincetown Art Association and Museum has five ground-floor galleries with rotating exhibitions on view throughout the year. Three sculpture gardens surround the building. The Museum School facilities include second-floor drawing, painting, and print studios. The entire building is equipped with an all-season climate control system.

A recent renovation and expansion of the Provincetown Art Association and Museum has dramatically improved the museum's ability to store and display art. In 2004, the federal-style Ephraim Cook House was restored.

PAAM's physical plant has been awarded a Silver LEED rating by the United States Green Building Council to recognize PAAM's Leadership in Energy and Environmental Design. The rating quantifies PAAM's environmental performance, and assures the public that PAAM's facility is designed and operated to help save energy and natural resources.

The renovation project, designed by Machado and Silvetti Associates, has also received a 2006 American Institute of Architects Merit Award for Design Excellence, and recognition within the AIA's 2007 Committee on the Environment (COTE). The building is wood-frame construction over a concrete basement. The historical portion of the Museum, which is listed on the National Register of Historic Places, is clad with white cedar shingles; the new portion of the Museum is clad with custom Spanish cedar shingles and louvers. As such, the new addition and facade expresses the tension between tradition and modernism that the Association has long exemplified.

Collection
PAAM's permanent collection features artists who have lived and worked on the Outer Cape. Some artists represented in the collection include Varujan Boghosian, Paul Bowen, George Elmer Browne, Oliver Newberry Chaffee, Carmen Cicero, Ciro Cozzi, Charles Henry Demuth, Edwin Dickinson, Chaim Gross, Charles Webster Hawthorne, Robert Henry, Henry Hensche, Hans Hofmann, Erik Koch, Franz Kline, Karl Knaths, Blanche Lazzell, William Littlefield, Peter Macara, Ross Moffett, Robert Motherwell, Man Ray, John Singer Sargent, Jack Tworkov, Andy Warhol, E. Ambrose Webster, Mike Wright, and James R. Zimmerman.

Educational programming

The Lillian Orlowsky/William Freed Museum School offers a range of classes and programs throughout the year. Over seventy summer studio courses are offered from May through September, including courses in drawing, printmaking, mixed media, plein air painting classes with prominent local artists, and computer classes. Life drawing sessions are offered twice a week year-round, and the Museum School holds open print studio hours during the winter. Fall, winter, and spring courses include week-long master classes, multi-week workshops, and semester-long offerings. This exciting program exemplifies PAAM's commitment to year-round educational opportunities for absolute beginners, established artists, and everyone in between.

In addition to adult courses, the Museum School also coordinates classes for children and teens. Art Reach, a 28-week after-school program created in conjunction with Provincetown High School, runs from October through May. PAAM also facilitates student curating sessions and offers children's art workshops in the summer.

Studio workshops are supplemented by free educational lectures. The Fredi Schiff Levin Lecture Series runs from June through September, with additional lectures taking place periodically as well. Guest lecturers include artists, authors, and art historians who are brought in to discuss the history of the Provincetown Art Colony as well as its contemporary art scene.

Gallery

See also
 Provincetown Printers, an art colony of the early 20th century

References

External links
The Provincetown Art Association and Museum Official Site
Machado and Silvetti Associates PAAM renovation
Anton Grassl PAAM portfolio
Provincetown Arts Press, Inc. Official Site

Further reading
Ahrens, Nyla. Provincetown: The Art Colony, A Brief History and Guide. Provincetown: Provincetown Art Association and Museum, 2000.
Bridges, Robert and Kristina Olson. Blanche Lazzell: The Hofmann Drawings. Morgantown: West Virginia University Press, 2004.
Moffett, Ross. Art In Narrow Streets: The First Thirty-Three Years of the Provincetown Art Association 1914-1947. Provincetown: Cape Cod Pilgrim Memorial Association, 1989.

Art museums and galleries in Massachusetts
Art schools in Massachusetts
Arts organizations based in Massachusetts
Institutions accredited by the American Alliance of Museums
Museums on the National Register of Historic Places in Massachusetts
Provincetown, Massachusetts
Museums in Barnstable County, Massachusetts
National Register of Historic Places in Barnstable County, Massachusetts
Arts organizations established in the 1910s
1914 establishments in Massachusetts